Ginnoruwa  is a village in Sri Lanka. It is located within Uva Province.

External links

Towns in Uva Province